The 2000 Sun Belt Conference men's basketball tournament was held March 4–7 at Alltel Arena in North Little Rock, Arkansas.

Louisiana–Lafayette defeated top-seeded   in the championship game, 51–50, to win their third Sun Belt men's basketball tournament.

The Ragin' Cajuns, in turn, received an automatic bid to the 2000 NCAA tournament. No other Sun Belt members earned bids to the tournament.

Format
The Sun Belt added one team, Denver, in the offseason, bringing total membership up to nine. 

The tournament field also expanded, adding a preliminary first round for two of the lowest seeded teams in the conference. With all nine Sun Belt teams seeded based on regular season conference records, the ninth-seeded team, rather than entering the play-in game, was paired with the tournament's top seed directly in the quarterfinals. Instead, the seventh- and eighth-seeded teams contested the play-in game, with a chance to play the second-seeded team in the ensuing quarterfinal round.

Bracket

See also
Sun Belt Conference women's basketball tournament

References

Sun Belt Conference men's basketball tournament
Tournament
Sun Belt Conference men's basketball tournament
Sun Belt Conference men's basketball tournament